Over Wyre is the collective name given to a group of villages in Lancashire, England, situated on the Fylde, to the north and east of the River Wyre.  The group is usually considered to include Hambleton, Stalmine, Knott End-on-Sea, Preesall, Pilling and Out Rawcliffe.  The name distinguishes these villages from the larger southern part of the Fylde, between the Wyre and the Ribble, which includes the urban areas of Blackpool, Poulton-le-Fylde, Thornton, Cleveleys, Fleetwood and Lytham St Annes.

External links
 Over-Wyre and Knott End History and Topography

Geography of the Borough of Wyre
The Fylde